Pristimantis bernali is a species of frog in the family Strabomantidae. It is endemic to Colombia. Its natural habitat is tropical moist montane forests.

It is threatened by habitat loss and is classified as critically endangered by the IUCN Red List of Threatened Species. It reproduces by direct development.

References

bernali
Amphibians of Colombia
Endemic fauna of Colombia
Amphibians described in 1986
Taxonomy articles created by Polbot